The Women's 5000 m speed skating competition for the 2002 Winter Olympics was held in Salt Lake City, Utah, United States.

Claudia Pechstein secures her third gold medal in the distance, having won each of the three times that this distance has been skated by women in the Olympics between 1994 and 2002. With the win, Pechstein also secures at least one medal in four consecutive Winter Games (1992–2002). Clara Hughes and Gretha Smit surprise by ending up on the podium alongside Pechstein. Smit, who broke the world record en route to finishing second, only started competing in long track skating a year before the Games, although she and her sisters had proven almost unbeatable in marathon skating, which is performed in groups.

Records
Prior to this competition, the existing world and Olympic records were as follows.

The following new world and Olympic records were set during this competition.

Results

References

Women's speed skating at the 2002 Winter Olympics
Women's events at the 2002 Winter Olympics